The Rhondda & District League (currently the Devonalds Solicitors Rhondda & District Football League for sponsorship reasons) is a football league covering the Rhondda and surrounding areas in South Wales. The leagues are at the seventh and eighth levels of the Welsh football league system.

History

The Rhondda & District Football League was formed on 7 June 1907. The league was originally called The Rhondda Junior League.

The original clubs elected to the league were:

First Division: Ton-Pentre Thistles, Maindy Crescents, Pentre Blue and Whites, Mill Vue, Porth United and (Tre)Hafod Juniors
Second Division: Ton-Pentre Juniors, Cwmparc Crescents, Ynyshir Albion, Tylorstown Crescents, Porth Reserves and Cymmer United.

In 1927 the league was called The Rhondda Valley (Amateur) Football League. At the time some clubs in the league were made up entirely of unemployed men. This resulted in the North Rhondda League being created because clubs were unable to afford travelling expenses. In 1929 the North Rhondda League was affiliated and in 1933 it was renamed The Upper Rhondda League. The leagues remained separated until the 1962–63 season when they reformed back into one league.

In 1931 a third League was formed called the Rhondda Fach League, but this dissolved after the 1937–38 season.

Throughout the Second World War The Rhondda League was one of the very few leagues to continue playing football;  because of the thousands of miners working in the collieries in the Rhondda.

Divisions
The league is composed of one division.

Member clubs 2022–23

Cwm Rhondda
Ely Valley
Ferndale BGC
Llwynypia BGC
Penygraig BGC
Porth Harlequins
Stanleytown
The Baglan
Tonypandy Albion
Tonyrefail BCG
Tonyrefail Welfare
Treorchy BGC 
Treorchy BGC development
Ynyscynon

Promotion and relegation
Promotion from the Premier Division is possible to the South Wales Alliance League, with the champion of the league playing the other tier 7 champions from the South Wales regional leagues via play-off games to determine promotion.

Champions of the Top division

Information for champions of the top division from 1954–55 to 2006–07 is sourced from a booklet to commemorate 100 Years of Football in the Rhondda League.

1900s

1907–08: – Trehafod

1930s

1936–37: – Rhondda Transport

1950s

1950–51: –
1951–52: –
1952–53: –
1953–54: –
1954–55: – Dinas Corries
1955–56: – Ystrad Athletic
1956–57: – Trebanog
1957–58: – Pentre BC
1958-59: – Pentre BC
1959–60: – Pentre BC

1960s

1960–61: – Blaencwm
1961–62: – Beatus
1962–63: – Llwynypia BC
1963–64: – Beatus
1964–65: – Dare Inglis
1965–66: – Dare Inglis
1966–67: – Dare Inglis
1967–68: – Rest Assured
1968-69: – Ton & Gelli BC
1969–70: – Cambrian United

1970s

1970–71: – Cambrian United
1971–72: – Cambrian United
1972–73: – Wattstown United
1973–74: – Gilfach United
1974–75: – Cambrian United
1975–76: – Gilfach United
1976–77: – Ferndale 'A'
1977–78: – Gilfach United
1978-79: – Ystrad BC
1979–80: – Penrhiwfer

1980s

1980–81: – Ystrad BC
1981–82: – Ystrad BC
1982–83: – Blaencwm
1983–84: – Treorchy BC
1984–85: – Ferndale BC
1985–86: – Kensington
1986–87: – Ferndale BC
1987–88: – Ferndale BC
1988-89: – Kensington
1989–90: – Blaencwm

1990s

1990–91: – Ynyshir/ Wattstown BGC
1991–92: – Stanleytown
1992–93: – Naval
1993–94: – Trebanog Workingmens
1994–95: – Penrhiwfer
1995–96: – Llwynypia WMC
1996–97: – Ynyshir Albions
1997–98: – Penrhys Athletic
1998-99: – Penrhys United
1999–2000: – Tonypandy Albion

2000s

2000–01: – Tonyrefail BC
2001–02: – Penrhys United 
2002–03: – Ferndale BC
2003–04: – Trebanog Rangers
2004–05: – Turberville Arms
2005–06: – Cambrian/ Clydach BGC
2006–07: – Tonypandy Albion
2007–08: – Wyndham
2008-09: – Ynyshir/ Wattstown BGC
2009–10: – Llwynypia BGC

2010s

2010–11: – Max United
2011–12: – Sporting Marvels
2012–13: – Sporting Marvels
2013–14: – Penygraig United
2014–15: – Gelli Hibs
2015–16: – Trebanog
2016–17: – Blaenrhondda
2017–18: – AFC Wattstown
2018–19: – Penygraig United
2019–20: – Treherbert BGC

2020s

2020–21: – Competition cancelled due to Coronavirus pandemic
2021–22: – Penygraig United (promoted to SWAL via playoffs)

References

External links
 Rhondda & District League

 
1907 establishments in Wales
Rhondda Cynon Taf
Football leagues in Wales